Tom Haughey (born 30 January 1982 in Keighley, West Yorkshire, England) is a rugby league footballer who played for Wakefield Trinity (2001-2002), London Broncos (2003-2004), Featherstone Rovers (Heritage No. 856) (2004 {on loan} and 2007–2009), Castleford Tigers (Heritage No. 825) (2005-2006), Hunslet Hawks (2010-2013) and York City Knights (2012)

Whilst at Featherstone he scored hat-tricks against Whitehaven, Celtic Crusaders and Batley Bulldogs.

He was selected for the Irish international squad, but never played in a match for them.

His position of choice is in the Second-row, and centre.

References

1982 births
Living people
Castleford Tigers players
English rugby league players
Featherstone Rovers players
Hunslet R.L.F.C. players
London Broncos players
Rugby articles needing expert attention
Rugby league players from Keighley
Wakefield Trinity players
York City Knights players